Douglas A. Brooks (1956–2009) was a noted Shakespeare scholar. He was an Associate Professor of English at Texas A&M University and wrote on early modern English literature. He is noted not only by his publications but also his editorship of The Shakespeare Yearbook.

Selected publications 

Brooks, D. A. (2000). From playhouse to printing house: Drama and authorship in early modern England. Cambridge: Cambridge University Press.
Brooks Douglas A. (2005) Printing and Parenting in Early Modern England
Brooks, D. A. (2008). Milton and the Jews. Cambridge: Cambridge University Press.

References 

Texas A&M University faculty
Shakespearean scholars
20th-century American male writers
20th-century American non-fiction writers
21st-century American male writers
21st-century American non-fiction writers
1956 births
2009 deaths
American male non-fiction writers